The Iranian Film Council (IFC) is a UK based organization dedicated to fighting piracy and copyright infringement within the film industry, specifically within modern Iranian Cinema. The council was established in October 2013 to focus on website piracy and the illegal transmission of films via satellite channels or video streaming. With legal representation in every territory across the globe, the IFC is able to represent the rights of Iranian film makers. 

The philosophy of the council is to promote a healthy attitude towards respecting copyrighting laws, in order to push for a more dynamic, valued overall industry. Through their website, the council allows individuals to become more educated on piracy and its implications and also has the option to report detected piracy directly to the council.

In addition to this, The Iranian Film Council works alongside legal online video streaming services to further promote a healthy environment for contemporary cinema to thrive.

Further reading

References

External links 

Film organisations in the United Kingdom